The Haikou People's Hospital is located on Renmin Avenue, Haidian Island, Haikou City, Hainan Province, China.

The hospital was founded in 1901, and has a staff of 2,254 people. There are available 1,700 beds, with a further 1,200 planned. The hospital has a total floor space of 250,000 square meters, containing an approximately 500 million yuan worth of medical equipment.

The main building on Renmin Avenue was constructed from about 2008 to 2011.

References

External links

 Website

Hospital buildings completed in 1901
Hospitals in Hainan
Buildings and structures in Haikou
1901 establishments in China
Hospitals established in 1901
Haidian Island